George Campbell McNeilage (3 August 1890 – 20 March 1967) was an Australian rules footballer who played with Geelong and Melbourne in the Victorian Football League (VFL). In addition, he played in the 1st Football XVIII 1905-1908, and held the role of Captain of Boats between 1907 and 1908.

Notes

External links 

 
 

1890 births
1967 deaths
People educated at Geelong College
Australian rules footballers from Victoria (Australia)
Australian Rules footballers: place kick exponents
Geelong Football Club players
Melbourne Football Club players